Yuhanon Chrysostamos is Metropolitan of Niranam Diocese of Malankara Orthodox Syrian Church.

References

1954 births
Living people
Malankara Orthodox Syrian Church bishops